Arthur Alexander Gilchrist (29 August 1879 – 27 June 1947) was an Australian rules footballer who played for the Melbourne Football Club in the Victorian Football League (VFL).

Notes

External links 

 

1879 births
1947 deaths
Australian rules footballers from South Australia
Melbourne Football Club players
Norwood Football Club players